The Tapestry Dance Company is a professional non-profit dance company in Austin, Texas. Founded in 1989, the company performs repertoire from a variety of dance genres and often blends different types of dance within their choreography. Initially a performing company of three, the organization has since expanded to seven resident artists, a diversified administrative and production support staff and a pre-professional and adult training facility. Tapestry Dance Company is supported by numerous organizations including the Texas Commission on the Arts and the National Endowment of the Arts.

External links
 Official Website of the Tapestry Dance Company

References

Dance companies in the United States
1989 establishments in Texas
Performing groups established in 1989
Dance in Texas
Non-profit organizations based in Texas